Spiral vegetable slicers (also known as spiralizers) are kitchen appliances used for cutting vegetables, such as zucchinis (to make zoodles), potatoes, cucumbers, carrots, apples, parsnips, and beetroots, into linguine-like strands which can be used as an alternative to pasta.

Popularity
According to Good Housekeeping and US News, spiralizers were a hot trending item as of September 2014. The LA Times stated that spiralizers became popular in the spring of 2014. Spiralizers are especially popular among people following the Paleo diet, other low-carb diets, and raw vegans.

Functionality

Spiralizers usually contain three blades: a round blade for spaghetti, a small flat blade for ribbons, and a large wide blade for spiral strands. Vegetables are clamped between the blade and crank. As the handle turns with a bit of pressure, the vegetable is pressed between the turning handle and the blade, which cuts it into spirals.

See also

 Meat slicer

References

Food preparation appliances
Food preparation utensils
Kitchenware